Cneazevca is a commune in Leova District, Moldova. It is composed of two villages, Cîzlar and Cneazevca.

References

Communes of Leova District